Ole Gustav Narud (born 26 February 1958) is a Norwegian politician for the Centre Party.

He was a deputy representative to the Parliament of Norway from Hedmark during the term 2009–2013, but without meeting in parliamentary session. In October 2021 he was appointed to Støre's Cabinet as State Secretary in the Ministry of Local Government and Modernisation. He was the mayor of Åmot from 2003 to 2011 and 2015 to 2019.

He was a twin brother of political scientist Hanne Marthe Narud (1958–2012).

References

1958 births
Living people
People from Åmot
Mayors of places in Hedmark
Centre Party (Norway) politicians
Deputy members of the Storting
Norwegian state secretaries
Norwegian twins